János Fodor (born 1960) is a Hungarian handball player. He participated at the 1980 Summer Olympics and at the 1988 Summer Olympics, where he placed fourth with the Hungarian national team.

References

1960 births
Living people
Hungarian male handball players
Olympic handball players of Hungary
Handball players at the 1980 Summer Olympics
Handball players at the 1988 Summer Olympics